Cai Yanyan (born 15 November 1999) is a Chinese badminton player. She won her first international title at the 2017 China International tournament in the women's singles event. Cai was the bronze medalists at the 2017 World Junior Championships and 2019 Asian Championships.

Achievements

Asian Championships
Women's singles

BWF World Junior Championships 
Girls' singles

BWF World Tour 
The BWF World Tour, which was announced on 19 March 2017 and implemented in 2018, is a series of elite badminton tournaments sanctioned by the Badminton World Federation (BWF). The BWF World Tour is divided into levels of World Tour Finals, Super 1000, Super 750, Super 500, Super 300 (part of the HSBC World Tour), and the BWF Tour Super 100.

Women's singles

BWF Grand Prix 
The BWF Grand Prix had two levels, the Grand Prix and Grand Prix Gold. It was a series of badminton tournaments sanctioned by the Badminton World Federation (BWF) and played between 2007 and 2017.

Women's singles

  BWF Grand Prix Gold tournament
  BWF Grand Prix tournament

BWF International Challenge/Series 
Women's singles

  BWF International Challenge tournament
  BWF International Series tournament

References

External links 
 

1999 births
Living people
Badminton players from Beijing
Chinese female badminton players
Badminton players at the 2018 Asian Games
Asian Games silver medalists for China
Asian Games medalists in badminton
Medalists at the 2018 Asian Games
21st-century Chinese women